Somabrachys dubar is a moth in the Somabrachyidae family. It was described by Powell in 1907.

References

Zygaenoidea
Moths described in 1907